Valisia LeKae (born September 25, 1979) is an American actress and singer. She was nominated for a 2014 Grammy Award and in 2013 she was nominated for the  Tony Award for Best Lead Actress in a Musical both for her performance as Diana Ross in the Broadway musical Motown: The Musical.

Personal life
LeKae was born and raised in Memphis, Tennessee, and listened to Motown records in her grandfather's barbershop as a youngster. She started to sing in church at age six and then worked at the Dollywood theme park. LeKae graduated from college with a degree in Psychology and minor in Child and Family Studies from the University of Tennessee, Knoxville.

LeKae left Motown: The Musical in December 2013 to be treated after a diagnosis of ovarian cancer.

In February 2014, LeKae was named spokesperson for The National Ovarian Cancer Coalition.

Career
She starred as Diana Ross in Motown: The Musical on Broadway, which opened in April 2013. The reviewer for TheaterMania wrote of her performance in Motown: The Musical:The one person who truly shines, though, is Valisia LeKae as Gordy's longtime paramour, superstar Diana Ross. It's not just her almost spot-on re-creation of Miss Ross' breathy voice and steely demeanor that commands our attention. The consistent display of her genuine star power – most evident in a thrilling 'Reach Out and Touch' segment – also draws us in. The TalkinBroadway reviewer wrote: "Valisia LeKae does a killer impersonation of Ross, and effectively mimics her smoky innocence."

For her performance she was nominated for the Tony Award for Best Actress in a Musical. She was also nominated for a Drama League Award (Distinguished Performance Award) and Outer Critics Circle Award (Outstanding Actress in a Musical) and won the Theatre World Award (Outstanding Broadway or Off-Broadway debut performance).

Previously, she was a swing and understudy in the Broadway productions of The Book of Mormon (2011), Ragtime (2009) for which she was the winner of a Joseph Jefferson Award, and The Threepenny Opera (2006) and a performer in 110 in the Shade (2007).

References

External links
 
 

1979 births
American musical theatre actresses
20th-century African-American women singers
Musicians from Memphis, Tennessee
Living people
Theatre World Award winners
21st-century African-American people
21st-century African-American women